John Thompson House may refer to:

 John Henry Thompson House, Millersburg, Kentucky, listed on the National Register of Historic Places
 John Thompson House (Highland, New York), listed on the National Register of Historic Places
 John L. Thompson House, The Dalles, Oregon
 John Thompson House (Richboro, Pennsylvania)

See also
Thompson House (disambiguation)